June Barbara Clare (née Schoch, 25 June 1926 – 14 February 2008) was a New Zealand sprinter. At the 1950 British Empire Games in Auckland, she won the silver medal in the women's 80 metre hurdles. She also competed in the long jump where she placed 11th.

Schoch married Ronald Geoffrey Clare at St Andrew's Church, Wellington, on 25 March 1950, a few weeks after the British Empire Games.

References

1926 births
2008 deaths
New Zealand female hurdlers
New Zealand female long jumpers
Commonwealth Games silver medallists for New Zealand
Athletes (track and field) at the 1950 British Empire Games
Commonwealth Games medallists in athletics
Medallists at the 1950 British Empire Games